is and adventure manga written by Moyamu Fujino.  The first two volumes were translated into English by ADV Manga (but has since been dropped) and was first published in 2002 by the Mag Garden corporation.  The story follows the trials of Prince Varumu in his journey to create pacts with various spirit masters.

Further reading

External links
 

Adventure anime and manga
Fantasy anime and manga
Shōnen manga
Mag Garden manga
ADV Manga